Makira-Ulawa Province is one of the nine provinces of Solomon Islands.

Geography
The main part of the province is Makira Island.  It has a population of 40,419 (2009). The capital is Kirakira.

Makira-Ulawa Province includes Makira (San Cristobal), Ulawa, Uki Ni Masi, Owaraha (Santa Ana), Owariki (Santa Catalina), Pio and others.

Makira Island is 3090km²: 139km long by 40km wide at around the centre of the island. Mountains run like a spine down the island's centre: the highest point reaches 1040 m, then falls steeply to the sea along its southern shore. Many rivers penetrate the island in roughly parallel lines every two to five kilometres. Makira has more inland swamps—and saltwater crocodiles—than any other island in the Solomon Islands. Its coast is the only part of the Solomons where the rare Olive, or Pacific Ridley, turtle is known to visit and nest.

Because Makira Island was isolated for long stretches of time during periods of high sea level, a wide variety of unique plants and animals evolved. For example, 12 of its 70 resident species of birds are endemic, as are two species of trees, both figs (Ficus cristobalensis and Ficus illiberalis). This uniqueness highlights the importance of preserving Makira's forest habitat.

Makira is also among the most important islands in the country for birds. There are some bird watching spots on the island. At the village of Hauta, situated hundreds of metres above sea level, at the Bauro inland region an established conservation area exists. However, one requires a permission to visit, which can be acquired from the Provincial Office at Kirakira.

Population
In 2009, the total population was estimated to be 40,419. Makira-Ulawa people are mostly Melanesian and their traditional dances and rituals are still strongly kept, especially in the islands of Santa Ana (Owaraha), Santa Catalina (Owariki), Uki-ni-masi and Ulawa.

On Makira, five languages are spoken: Arosi, Bauro, Fagani, Kahua, and Owa. The Bauro speakers have been considered to be the most isolated and conservative of the Makira groups. The people of Ulawa and Ugi Island speak Sa'a.

Administrative divisions
Makira-Ulawa Province is sub-divided into the following wards:

 Makira-Ulawa Province (40,419)
North Ulawa (1,169)
South Ulawa (1,294)
West Ulawa (860)
Ugi and Pio (1,212)
Arosi South (3,009)
Arosi West (2,009)
Arosi North (2,344)
Arosi East (2,054)
Bauro West (3,925)
Bauro Central (4,562)
Bauro East (1,625)
Wainoni West (2,131)
Wainoni East (2,488)
Star Harbour North (3,262)
Santa Ana (1,547)
Santa Catalina (811)
Star Harbour South (1,138)
Rawo (677)
Weather Cast (1,658)
Haununu (2,644)

Islands
 Ali'ite
 Makira (San Cristobal)
 Malaulalo
 Malaupaina
 Owaraha (Santa Ana)
 Owariki (Santa Catalina)
 Pio
 Ugi
 Ulawa

References

 
Provinces of the Solomon Islands
States and territories established in 1981
1981 establishments in the Solomon Islands